Scymnus nigricollis, is a species of beetle found in the family Coccinellidae discovered by J. Gordon Edwards in 1976. It is endemic to North America.

References 

Coccinellidae